Paulo Jorge Ruão da Silva Pinto Malheiro (born 8 June 1985) commonly known as Ginho, is a Portuguese footballer who plays as a defender for Paredes.

Club career
He started his career with Liga de Honra club Trofense. After 1 year he joined Penafiel. He made 17 appearances for the club before joining Ayia Napa.

Club statistics

Honours

Club
Cherno More
 Bulgarian Supercup: 2015

References

External links
 
 

1985 births
Living people
People from Paredes, Portugal
Portuguese footballers
Portugal youth international footballers
Association football defenders
U.S.C. Paredes players
C.D. Trofense players
F.C. Penafiel players
APOP Kinyras FC players
Ayia Napa FC players
C.F. União players
C.D. Aves players
PFC Cherno More Varna players
C.D. Cinfães players
F.C. Felgueiras 1932 players
Portuguese expatriate footballers
Expatriate footballers in Cyprus
Portuguese expatriate sportspeople in Cyprus
Expatriate footballers in Bulgaria
Segunda Divisão players
Liga Portugal 2 players
Cypriot First Division players
First Professional Football League (Bulgaria) players
Sportspeople from Porto District